Agaricicola is a genus in the phylum Pseudomonadota (Bacteria).

Etymology
The name Agaricicola derives from:New Latin noun Agaricus, generic name of a mushroom; Latin suff. -cola (from Latin masculine gender or feminine gender noun incola), dweller; New Latin masculine gender noun Agaricicola, Agaricus-dweller, reflecting isolation of the first strain from Agaricus blazei (Murrill).

Species
The genus contains a single species, namely A. taiwanensis (Chu et al. 2010),  (Type species of the genus).; New Latin masculine gender adjective taiwanensis, pertaining to Taiwan, where the type strain was isolated.)

See also
 Bacterial taxonomy
 Microbiology

References 

Bacteria genera
Rhodobacteraceae
Monotypic bacteria genera